Standish is a neighborhood within the Powderhorn community in Minneapolis, Minnesota, United States named after Captain Miles Standish. Its boundaries are East 36th Street to the north, Hiawatha Avenue to the east, East 42nd and 43rd Streets to the south, and Cedar Avenue to the west. It shares a neighborhood organization with the Ericsson neighborhood, even though that neighborhood is part of the Nokomis community; signs at the neighborhood boundaries welcome you to "Standish-Ericsson". Roosevelt High School is located in Standish.

References

External links
Minneapolis Neighborhood Profile - Standish
Standish-Ericsson Neighborhood Association
 Standish and Ericsson Neighbors Forum - Online Group

Neighborhoods in Minneapolis